Bigarello is a comune (municipality) in the Province of Mantua in the Italian region Lombardy, located about  east of Milan and about  east of Mantua.

Geography
The municipality contains the frazioni (subdivisions, mainly villages and hamlets) of Bazza, Gazzo (municipal seat) and Stradella.

Bigarello borders the following municipalities: Castel d'Ario, Castelbelforte, Roncoferraro, San Giorgio di Mantova, Sorgà.

Demographic evolution

See also
Giuseppe De Luigi, artist born in Bigarello

References

External links
 Official site of Bigarello 

Cities and towns in Lombardy